Lucien Marcus Underwood (October 26, 1853 – November 16, 1907) was an American botanist and mycologist of the 19th and early 20th centuries.

Early life and career
He was born in New Woodstock, New York. He enrolled at Syracuse University in 1873 and graduated in 1877. He earned his masters in 1878 and finally and completed his PhD in 1879 under Alexander Winchell. During his graduate school, he taught at Cazenovia Seminary for two years.

After a year's teaching at Hedding College, in 1880 he was appointed professor of geology and botany in Illinois Wesleyan University. In 1883, he was appointed professor of geology, botany, and zoology at Syracuse. In 1890, he accepted the Morgan Fellowship at Harvard University to study the Sullivant and Taylor collection of hepatics. In 1891 he became professor of botany in De Pauw University. In 1896, after one year stint as a biology professor at Alabama Polytechnic Institute (Auburn), Underwood became a professor of botany at Columbia University and joined the staff of the New York Botanical Garden in 1907.

Works
Underwood published numerous papers in botanical journals, and was the author of Our Native Ferns and how to study them (Bloomington, Ill., 1881; 4th ed., 1893), Descriptive Catalogue of North American Hepaticae (New York, 1884) and “Hepaticae” in Gray's Manual of Botany. He also prepared the exsiccata work An Illustrated Century of Fungi with 100 specimens (1889), and together with Orator F. Cook the exsiccata work Hepaticae Americanae with 160 specimens (1887–93).

Underwood's papers are maintained at the LuEsther T. Mertz Library of the New York Botanical Garden.

Personal life
After losing large amounts of money on Wall Street, Underwood attempted to murder his wife and daughter before committing suicide at the family's home in  Redding, Connecticut.

See also
 :Category:Taxa named by Lucien Marcus Underwood

References

External links

 

1853 births
1907 deaths
1907 suicides
American botanists
American mycologists
Auburn University faculty
Cazenovia College faculty
DePauw University faculty
Illinois Wesleyan University faculty
People from Madison County, New York
Pteridologists
Scientists from New York (state)
Suicides by sharp instrument in the United States
Suicides in Connecticut
Syracuse University College of Arts and Sciences alumni
Syracuse University faculty
Torrey Botanical Society members